Andy Roddick was the defending champion, but withdrew due to an Abdominal strain.

Arnaud Clément won in the final 7–6(7–3), 6–2, against Andy Murray.

Seeds
All seeds receive a bye into the second round.

Draw

Finals

Top half

Section 1

Section 2

Bottom half

Section 3

Section 4

External links
 Main draw
 Qualifying draw

Legg Mason Tennis Classic Singles